Tim Luis Maciejewski (born 5 March 2001) is a German professional footballer who plays as a right winger for Union Berlin.

Career
Maciejewski made his professional debut for Union Berlin in the Bundesliga on 7 November 2020, coming on as a substitute for Sheraldo Becker in the 83rd minute of the home match against Arminia Bielefeld, which finished as a 5–0 win.

References

External links
 
 
 
 

2001 births
Living people
Footballers from Berlin
German footballers
Association football wingers
Bundesliga players
2. Liga (Austria) players
Austrian Football Bundesliga players
1. FC Union Berlin players
SK Austria Klagenfurt players
German expatriate footballers
German expatriate sportspeople in Austria
Expatriate footballers in Austria
SC Staaken players